Pratt v A-G for Jamaica is a 1993 Judicial Committee of the Privy Council (JCPC) case in which it was held that it was unconstitutional in Jamaica to execute a prisoner who had been on death row for 14 years. The JCPC held that because the Constitution of Jamaica prohibits "inhuman or degrading punishment", excessive delays cannot occur between sentencing and execution of the punishment. In cases of such excessive delay, the death sentence should be commuted to life imprisonment.

The JCPC held that any delay of more than five years between sentencing and execution was prima facie evidence that carrying out the sentence would constitute inhuman or degrading punishment. It suggested that the entire appeals process in Jamaica should take no more than two years, and that any further applications to the United Nations Human Rights Council should take no more than 18 months.

External links
Pratt v A-G for Jamaica, bailii.org

1993 in case law
1993 in Jamaica
Death penalty case law
Judicial Committee of the Privy Council cases on appeal from Jamaica
Prisoners sentenced to death by Jamaica